CGS Alaska was a Canadian Government Ship, employed on a survey of Canada's Arctic, in the early 20th century.  She was a schooner, built in Alaska, in 1912, and acquired by the Canadian Government, which employed her as part of a fleet of 6 small exploration ships from 1913–1918.  She was the only ship that lasted the entire expedition.  She was sold in 1918.

References

Alaska
Exploration ships